Donald Card (14 July 1928 – 12 July 2022) was a South African security policeman and politician who was the Mayor of East London.

Biography
Card was born on 14 July 1928 in Port St Johns, Pondoland, Union of South Africa. He was present in Duncan Village in 1953 on the day Elsie Quinlan, a Dominican nun, was brutally killed. In the aftermath of the nun's killing, the police retaliated by killing up to 200 people involved in the rioting that led to Quinlan's death. He was also implicated in police brutality and torture in evidence given at the Truth and Reconciliation Commission in 1997.

In 2004, a symbolic ceremony of reconciliation took place at the inauguration of the Nelson Mandela Centre of Memory Project; Card handed back to Nelson Mandela 78 letters written by Mandela on Robben Island. These letters were previously unknown.

Card died after collapsing at a retirement home in East London, Eastern Cape on 12 July 2022 at the age of 93.

References

Citations

Sources

External links

The Donald Card collection of Nelson Mandela's letters from prison
Mncedisi Mapela's evidence to the South African Truth and Reconciliation Commission

1928 births
2022 deaths
Mayors of places in South Africa
South African police officers
White South African people
People from Cape Town